David Howell (born ) is an Australian professional rugby league footballer for Harlequins RL in the Super League. Howell previously played for the St George Illawarra Dragons and the Canberra Raiders in the National Rugby League.

NRL career
Howell made his first grade début for the St George Illawarra Dragons in 2003, where he made 12 NRL appearances before joining the Canberra Raiders in 2005.

He was released from the final year of his contract with the Canberra Raiders to join the London-based Harlequins. The Raiders told Howell he would not have a spot in the team after 2008 when his contract terminated.

Howell scored 15 tries in 48 games for Canberra during the last three seasons.

Super League career
Originally linked with Wigan, Howell signed a two-year deal at The Stoop.

He was the sixth addition to the Londoners squad for 2008's Super League XIII. Howell played in the centres and replaced Great Britain international Paul Sykes.

Howell's solid form in the  Super League has sparked rumours of a return to the National Rugby League (NRL). Whether or not Howell decides to leave The Stoop is yet to be seen.

See also
 Canberra Raiders

References

External links

 Quins profile
 RLeague.com stats
 NRL stats
 stats.rleague.com
 David Howell 606
 Hear from Howell

1983 births
Australian rugby league players
St. George Illawarra Dragons players
Canberra Raiders players
London Broncos players
Rugby league wingers
Rugby league centres
Rugby league fullbacks
Living people
Rugby league players from Sydney